Edward W. Piotrowski (b. Rybnik, Poland, 1955) is head of the Applied Mathematics Group at the University of Białystok, Poland. He is notable for the analysis of quantum strategies, showing connections between the Kelly criterion, thermodynamics, and special theory of relativity. In the area of econophysics, he discovered extremal properties of fixed point profits of elementary merchant tactics. He has published in the areas of statistical physics, quantum game theory, and econophysics.

Education
He graduated in theoretical physics from the University of Silesia (Katowice) and earned his PhD and habilitation from the University of Silesia, under Andrzej Pawlikowski.

See also
 Quantum Aspects of Life

External links
 
 Piotrowski at Ideas
 Piotrowski's homepage
 Piotrowski at Scientific Commons

1955 births
Living people
University of Silesia in Katowice alumni
20th-century Polish physicists
Quantum physicists
Probability theorists
21st-century Polish physicists
Academic staff of the University of Białystok